Onithochiton neglectus neglectus is a subspecies of chiton in the family Chitonidae.

Description
O. neglectus neglectus is a brooding chiton, which means that the eggs develop attached to the body of females.

Ecology
O. neglectus often inhabits the holdfasts of Durvillaea southern bull kelp. Genetic and shell morphological variation in the species appears to have been affected by the frequency individuals inhabiting Durvillaea holdfasts, and the population structure of O. neglectus has likely been influenced by individuals being transported within buoyant rafts of Durvillaea species.

Distribution
This subspecies is endemic to New Zealand, being mostly found at the East Coast of the North Island and the South Island.

References

 Powell A. W. B., New Zealand Mollusca, William Collins Publishers Ltd, Auckland, New Zealand 1979 

Chitonidae
Chitons of New Zealand
Subspecies